The BMW S68 is a twin-turbocharged V8 engine produced by BMW. It will be used for the first time in the 2022 revised BMW X7 as the M60i. A few weeks after its presentation, BMW showed a study of the XM with a more powerful version of the engine. In addition, the basic version is also used in the BMW 760i for the US market.

Design
It has one turbocharger per cylinder bank and both chargers are placed in the middle of the cylinder banks in a hot-vee design taken from the previous S63 variant; there is only one exhaust manifold. The engine oil is cooled by an external cooler, and a newly developed oil pump is used for the oil circuit. The electric motor is also used for hot starts, while cold starts are performed by a standard 12 volt starter similar to most other engines. The 48-volt battery found in the X7 M60i, XM, and the 760i models has a capacity of 20 Ah. the battery required for this has a capacity of 90 Ah. The variable camshaft control (VANOS) is now electrical and no longer hydraulic. The S68 currently meets the Euro 6d emissions standard, but should also be able to achieve the stricter Euro 7 standard, which is planned for 2025.

A maximum speed of 7200 rpm is reported for the combustion engine.

It seems to date that the S68 is an evolution of the S63 with common issues being rectified, and being paired to a mild hybrid transmission.

See also
 List of BMW engines

References

S68
V8 engines
Gasoline engines by model